Thylacodes decussatus is a species of sea snail, a marine gastropod mollusk in the family Vermetidae, the worm snails or worm shells. This species was previously known as Serpulorbis decussatus.

Distribution

Description
The maximum recorded shell length is 90 mm.

Habitat
The minimum recorded depth for this species is 0 m; maximum recorded depth is 80 m.

References

Vermetidae
Gastropods described in 1791
Taxa named by Johann Friedrich Gmelin